Rəzvan (also, Rezvan and Razvayn) is a village in the Lankaran Rayon of Azerbaijan.  The village forms part of the municipality of Daştatük.

References 

Populated places in Lankaran District